Sterphus tinctus is a species of Hoverfly in the family Syrphidae.

Distribution
Brazil.

References

Eristalinae
Insects described in 1951
Diptera of South America